Comic Book Confidential is an American/Canadian documentary film, released in 1988. Directed by Ron Mann and written by Mann and Charley Lippincott, the film is a survey of the history of the comic book medium in the United States from the 1930s to the 1980s, as an art form and in social context.

Synopsis
The film includes profiles of twenty-two notable and influential talents in the comics field, such as Charles Burns, Art Spiegelman, Françoise Mouly, Frank Miller, Stan Lee, Will Eisner, Robert Crumb, Harvey Pekar and William M. Gaines. In interviews, the creators discuss their contributions and history, and read passages from their works over filmograph animations. Montages of comics through the decades, archival footage of an old 1950s show called Confidential File, and a live-action Zippy the Pinhead are featured.

Production
According to Mann, the project started in the mid-1980s when he was working on a press kit of the comedy Legal Eagles. He secretly used resources from that project (including the studio's crew, money and film stock) to interview his subjects during his off hours. Due to running time constraints, Mann couldn't include footage with musician Frank Zappa, Scrooge McDuck creator Carl Barks, All American Comics editor Julius "Julie" Schwartz, and editor of the first all-woman comic book It Ain't Me Babe, Trina Robbins.

Release
Confidential was first released theatrically in Canada in 1988, and in the United States on April 27, 1989. It was released unrated. The 1991 laserdisc had extra features consisting of a complete comic by each artist, shot for TV viewing.

It was one of the first films to be released in CD-ROM format for home computer viewing  (as a forerunner of the 2002 DVD), with 120 pages of comics and the complete Comics Code. The CD-ROM received positive reviews from USA Today in 1994 and The Complete Idiots Guide to CD-ROM in 1995.

Reception
The film received the 1989 Genie Award for Best Feature Length Documentary from the Academy of Canadian Cinema and Television.  Caryn James of The New York Times found the film deft and intelligent—it "takes off when it abandons the archives and focuses on the creators," but "it plays to the converted," and its attempt to relate comics to social context is "fleeting." Desson Howe, in the Washington Post, wrote that the film was "a pleasure," and engaging throughout. Christopher Null at MovieCritic.com found the comics themselves the least interesting, and the interviews the "real joy" of the film. Peter Rist described the film in 2001 as "Mann's greatest success, both critically and popularly."

References

External links

 
 
 Comic Book Confidential. Canadian Film Encyclopedia; Film Reference Library (CA).

Documentary films about comics
1988 films
American documentary films
Best Documentary Film Genie and Canadian Screen Award winners
Canadian documentary films
Films directed by Ron Mann
1988 documentary films
Comics fandom
Documentary films about fandom
1980s English-language films
1980s American films
1980s Canadian films